WNAS (88.1 FM) is the student-run high school radio station of New Albany High School and Floyd Central High School in southern Indiana, (along with WNAS-TV). The station's call letters, WNAS, reflect the ownership by the New Albany Floyd County School Corporation. The first FM student-run high school radio station to be licensed by the Federal Communications Commission (FCC), WNAS has been broadcasting live since May 28, 1949.

History 

WNAS (88.1 FM) has been broadcasting live since the spring of 1949, when its first broadcast was of the New Albany High School commencement ceremony. It was the first FM student-run high school radio station to be licensed by the Federal Communications Commission (FCC). WNAS  is the student-run high school radio station of New Albany High School and Floyd Central High School in southern Indiana. The station's call letters reflect the ownership by the New Albany Floyd County School Corporation. In 1980, the corporation also began broadcasting WNAS-TV.

Management 
Assistant Principal Marvin Oakes guided WNAS through its formative years. Robert Willman, an English teacher, assumed the management role in 1954. Jerry Weaver served as the general manager from 1960 to 1969, followed later by Lee Kelly who held this post from 1973 to 2013. Jason Flener, former assistant principal for NAHS, and a former WNAS student staff member, replaced Kelly beginning in the 2013–2014 school year.  Since the beginning of the 2017–18 school year, Brian Sullivan has been the general manager.  Floyd Central's program is currently headed by Brian Shaw, now in his fifth year.

Studio 
Recently, Floyd Central completed entire renovations of its TV and radio studios. These studios are considered by many local TV and radio personalities to be better than their own. Sarah Jordan of 99.7 WDJX even told students at Floyd Central, "Become a part of the Radio/TV program because the stuff you all are using is a lot better than what I have."

Programming 
WNAS can be picked up throughout all of the Louisville metropolitan area and is known for its eclectic programming. The station broadcasts music 24 hours a day when it's not covering boys and girls basketball, football, baseball, and volleyball for both New Albany and Floyd Central. The station provides streaming audio from its website (wnas.org).  WNAS-New Albany can also be heard online through their (TuneIn) TuneIn feed, which can also be downloaded for free on any smartphone.

References

External links 
 

NAS
NAS
New Albany, Indiana
High school radio stations in the United States
Radio stations established in 1949